The La Guaira to Caracas Railway was a narrow-gauge railway in Venezuela. From 1883 to 1951 it linked Caracas, the capital of Venezuela, to its port La Guaira.
Caracas is only  from the Caribbean. To help with the mountainous terrain, the line used a narrow gauge. At 36-inches the track gauge was narrower than that of the Great Venezuela Railway, for example. There were 8 tunnels.

History of the line 
A rail route was surveyed by the British engineer Robert Stephenson as early as 1824. The main reason for Stephenson being in South America was to develop mines in Colombia, but he landed at La Guaira where, before moving on to Colombia, he assessed various projects on behalf of potential investors. The locomotives of the time would not have coped with the climb to Caracas, and he proposed that the trains should be pulled by animals ("blood traction"). It was decided not to proceed with the project, probably for economic reasons.

A railway offered an easier way to move goods to the capital and to export the country's agricultural produce, and interest in the project revived in the following decades. The route was re-surveyed. In 1880, during the second presidency of Antonio Guzmán Blanco, the Venezuelan Government authorised a British company to construct and operate the railway.
The technology, including six steam locomotives made by Nasmyth, Wilson & Co. of Manchester, mainly came from England. There was no industrialised iron production in Venezuela. The Venezuelan engineer Jesús Muñoz Tébar reported:

The line opened in 1883. The opening was presented as one of the events celebrating the centenary of the birth of Simón Bolívar.

The profitability of Venezuelan railways was affected by the unstable political situation in the country at the end of the 19th century. However, LG&C seems to have suffered less than the Puerto Cabello and Valencia Railway and the Great Venezuela Railway.

Electrification
In 1926 LG&C decided to electrify the line and work began the following year, resulting in a speedier service. A power plant was built at Zigzag station ten miles from La Guaira.

Closure
In the 1950s the Venezuelan government gave priority to road transport. It spent large sums on the construction of the Caracas-La Guaira highway which began in 1950. Storms damaged the railway line in 1951 and it never reopened.

References

External links
 La Guaira and Caracas Railway

3 ft gauge railways
Narrow-gauge railways in Venezuela
Railway lines opened in 1883